The Billboard Music Award for Top Radio Songs Artist winners and nominees. Rihanna and The Weeknd have won the award the most times.

Winners and nominees

Superlatives

Wins

 2 (Rihanna, The Weeknd)

Nominations

 4 (Justin Bieber, Ed Sheeran); 3 (Bruno Mars, Katy Perry, Rihanna, The Weeknd); 2 (Maroon 5, Nicki Minaj, Taylor Swift)

References

Billboard awards